Uli may refer to:
Uli, Iran, a village
Uli, Anambra, a town in Nigeria
Uli I of Mali
Uli (design), by the Igbo people of Nigeria
Uli figure, from New Ireland, Papua New Guinea
Uli (food), a rice-based food
 ISO 639 code for the Ulithian language

Uli is a name, short for Ulrich or Ulrike (disambiguation) and common in Germany.
 Uli Beckerhoff (born 1947), Jazz composer
Uli der Fehlerteufel, a character in German schoolbooks
 Uli Derickson (1944–2005), flight attendant during the 1985 hijacking of TWA Flight 847
 Uli Edel (born 1947), German film director
 Uli Herzner (born 1971), German American fashion designer
 Uli Hiemer (born 1962), German professional ice hockey player
 Uli Hoeneß (born 1952), German football (soccer) player
 Uli Kusch (born 1967), heavy metal drummer
 Uli Jon Roth (born 1954), German neoclassical metal guitarist
 Uli Schmidt (born 1961), South African rugby union footballer
Uli Sigg (born 1946), Swiss businessman, diplomat, art collector
 Uli Stein (born 1954), German football player
 Uli Stielike (born 1954), German football player
 Uli Trepte (1941–2009), German musician
 Uli Vos (born 1946), field hockey player from Germany

ULI may stand for:
Uniono por la Linguo Internaciona Ido (Union for the International Language Ido)
Union List of Israel
Urban Land Institute